Take Two is a 2010 juvenile fiction novel by Julia DeVillers and Jennifer Roy. This book is part of their twins series.

Plot
The story line taking place right after the first book (Trading Faces) ends, identical twin sisters Payton and Emma Mills are entering detentions, when they learn they are to report to the school guidance counselor's, Counselor Case, office. Instead of serving detention, the twins must do community service, Emma tutoring Counselor Case's troublesome eight-year-old twin boys.
The twins must deal with the social stigma of middle school, they both have their own friends, while remaining close. Payton is very close to Tess and seems to be developing a crush on Nick, the tech guy for the school play, although she doesn't know it yet. She also has to deal with Sydney and Cashmere constantly putting her down and works on standing up to Sydney. Emma is friends with Quinn, and is not officially in a relationship with Ox, although it is very obvious they like each other. Emma is nemesis's with Jazmine James, another very intellectual girl. Both are very competitive with each other.

As Emma's relationship with Ox continues and becomes better friends with Quinn, she gets very confused. Between tutoring the twin boys, who bring a gecko to Emma's lessons every time, creating even more stress for her, friendships and relationships, Emma feels she must decide between social life or winning competitions and beating her nemesis, Jazmine James, she decides to go back to being AcadEmma, all academics and no social life. Quinn and Ox get upset by this, Emma even breaking up with Ox and starts ignoring all Quinn's invitations to hang out with her. At the end, Ox is not allowed to date but wants to date Emma.

Meanwhile, Payton works in the stage basement, and is very upset that Tess and Sydney and everyone else get to be in the play, while Sydney constantly torments her. Payton also feels left out, and even resorts to pretending to be Emma and eating lunch in the library. When she sees Tess, Nick, Reilly and all her other friends from the play practicing without her, she is heartbroken. Payton also becomes better friends with Tess and Payton begins to have a crush on Nick, who returns her feelings, although neither of them are aware of that yet.

Things eventually get better for the Mills Twins. Emma wins mathletes, and when Sydney breaks her ankle the night of the school play, Payton takes over her role as Glinda from "The a Wizard of Oz". However, one of the twins that Emma tutors, Mason Case-Babbit, loses his gecko, so Payton must look for it, due to Emma having a phobia of small reptiles. Emma then takes over Payton's role, but everyone, except for Tess, who tells the twins that she knew after the play, thinks it's Payton. Emma gets over her fear of geckos and searches the basement herself after realizing how important the play is to Payton, and Payton goes on stage.

After the play, Payton and Emma meet Nick's family, when Emma realizes that she can succeed in competitions and do well in school and balance a social life at the same time. She becomes "unofficial" boyfriend and girlfriend with Ox, due to the fact that their parents think they are too young to date. Payton becomes aware of her crush on Nick (although not revealed until the next book). The Mills twins realize that everything will be all right for them.

Characters
 Payton Mills The fashionable, social twin. She is friends with Tess and Nick.
 Emma Mills The studious, serious twin. She has an unofficial relationship with Ox and is good friends with Quinn. She also has a love of fashion, along with Payton, although not as flamboyant about it, which she realizes in the first book.
 Mason Case-Babbitt One of Counselor Case and the mathlete's coach's, Coach Babbitt, twins. He is the dumber, more troublesome of the twins. He has a crush on Payton.
 Jason Case-Babbitt One of Counselor Case and the Coach Babbitt's twins. He is the smart, less troublesome, to an extent, of the twins. He has a joy for math and is on a ninth-grade level.
 Ox Garrett The hot quarterback that has a crush on Emma, which she returns. He is very popular with Sydney and her group of friends, but he chooses Emma because he likes how smart and down-to-earth she is, compared to Sydney and her friends, which he states in the first book, "I've been trying to avoid them for years. Their conversations give me a headache."
 Nick Payton's friend and crush. He usually does the backstage stuff during plays and VOGS. He and Payton have feelings for each other, which they realize in the next book. Although a bit nerdy, he is very well-liked.
 Quinn One of Emma's friends. She is in Sydney's circle of friends, but doesn't enjoy it much of the time, because of Sydney's bad attitude.
 Tess Payton's friend, who started out as Jazmine's sidekick in the first book, but started to realize how nasty Jazmine and Hector could be.
 Sydney Fish Payton and Emma's nemesis. She is very rude to both twins, calling Emma a loser and Payton a poser. She has no true friends, besides Cashmere, who is only loyal to her because Sydney seems to intimidate her. She is very pretty, identified by many people in the series. Her hair is shiny and razor-sharp at the ends.
 Jazmine James Emma's archenemy, who excels in academics, like Emma, and is her main competitor in many competitions. Her right-hand man is Hector, who is almost always by her side.
 Cashmere Sydney's sidekick/follower, who is frightened by her. She's always with Sydney, and is very air-headed. She is described as having wavy blonde hair and "a big clothes mooch." It is revealed in the third book that she has a beautiful soprano singing voice but doesn't join drama club because Sydney is worried that Cashmere will outshine her, as Sydney is not as talented as Cashmere.
 Hector Jazmine's right-hand man. He isn't as rude as Jazmine, but still unpleasant.
 Mrs. Burkle Payton and Emma's ELA teacher, who also runs drama club and VOGS. She is very enthusiastic, and once dreamed of being on Broadway. Nevertheless, she is a very good teacher, and runs almost all extracurricular activities having to do with drama, acting or stage presentation.
 Counselor Case The school guidance counselor. She is married to Coach Babbitt.
 Coach Babbitt Emma's mathlete's coach. He is married to Counselor Case. In Australia.

References

American young adult novels
2010 children's books
Simon & Schuster books
Twins in fiction